Franck Fontan (born 16 September 1973) is a French former professional footballer. He marked his debut in 1990 playing for Bordeaux B, his original position was goalkeeper.

Personal life
Fontan was born and raised in Biarritz, France. He retired as a player on 1 July 2003.

References

1973 births
Living people
Sportspeople from Biarritz
French footballers
Association football goalkeepers
Ligue 1 players
FC Girondins de Bordeaux players
Stade Bordelais (football) players
French-Basque people
Footballers from Nouvelle-Aquitaine